Unsung Heroes is the fifth studio album by Finnish folk metal band Ensiferum. It was released on 27 August 2012 through Spinefarm Records.

Recording and production

In February 2012, the band entered the studio and started recordings for the then untitled album. The band also announced on their Facebook page they would keep their fans up to date on their Mobile Twilight Tavern and with a weekly studio diary on Spinefarm's YouTube channel. The album would also include guest appearances by members of Die Apokalyptischen Reiter and the Finnish singer and actor Vesa-Matti Loiri. In late March, the band was in the final stages of the recordings for the album and completed recordings in early April.

In May, the band revealed the title for the album, Unsung Heroes and announced its release date, 27 August 2012. The album would also be released through Spinefarm Records. Then in late June the band unveiled the album cover artwork, again designed by Kristian Wahlin. On 9 July they posted on their Facebook page a YouTube video with Burning Leaves, one of their new songs on the album.

On 17 July the band posted a link with the making of their new video clip for In My Sword I Trust, also a new song to be featured on the album. The video was shot in Wrocław, Poland by Grupa 13 who were also recruited for the recent video clips of other notable bands like Amon Amarth and Behemoth. The actual video was uploaded on August 8 on Spinefarm's YouTube channel, which reached over a hundred thousand views within the first week.

Track listing

Personnel
Ensiferum
Petri Lindroos - harsh vocals, guitar, backing vocals
Markus Toivonen - guitar, acoustic guitars, dulcimer, bouzouki, clean vocals, backing vocals
Sami Hinkka - bass guitar, acoustic guitar, backing vocals (harsh/clean)
Janne Parviainen - drums, backing vocals
Emmi Silvennoinen - keyboards, hammond, grand piano, pump organ, backing vocals

Guest musicians
Vesa-Matti Loiri - speech on "Pohjola"
Laura Dziadulewicz - vocals on "Celestial Bond"
Ulla Bürger - soprano vocals on "Passion, Proof, Power"
Lassi Lógren - nyckelharpa
Timo Väänänen - kantele
Pasi Puolakka - flute, descant & sopranino Recorders
Kasper Mårtenson - moog
Volk-Man, Ady & Fuchs (Die Apokalyptischen Reiter) - additional voices on "Passion, Proof, Power"
Heidi Parviainen (Dark Sarah, ex-Amberian Dawn) - choir vocals

Crew
Kristian Wåhlin - album artwork
Hiili Hiilesmaa - production, engineering and mixing

References

2012 albums
Ensiferum albums